Lucien-François de Montagnac (17 May 1803 – 23 September 1845) was a French lieutenant colonel. Sent to Africa in 1845, he was responsible for several massacres of civilians during the French conquest of Algeria and was killed at the Battle of Sidi-Brahim.

Life
Montagnac was born in Pouru-aux-Bois.  He took part in the Spanish expedition of 1823 and rose to lieutenant on 30 December 1827. He severely put down the June Rebellion in 1832 but refused the Légion d'honneur he was offered in reward by Louis-Philippe of France, explaining he was "resolved to await this reward on an occasion I will better deserve it".

Sidi-Brahim

Massacres
Colonel de Montagnac  was quoted as saying while in Algeria, "I have some heads cut off , not the heads of artichokes but the heads of men."

References

1803 births
1845 deaths
People from Ardennes (department)
French Army officers